A55 may refer to:

Roads 
 A55 highway (Australia), a road connecting St George, Queensland and Lithgow, New South Wales
 A55 motorway (Canada), a road in Québec connecting Stanstead and Shawinigan
 A55 motorway (France), a road connecting Marseille and Martigues
 A55 road (Great Britain), a road connecting Chester and Holyhead
 Autostrada A55 (Italy), a bypass around Turin
 A55 road (Northern Ireland), a road around Belfast

Electronics 
 A-series light bulb of diameter 55 mm
 a model of a Fusion Controller Hub (FCH), a chipset used for AMD microprocessors
 Sony Alpha 55, a DSLT camera
 Siemens A55, a mobile phone
 ARM Cortex-A55, a processor microarchitecture

Other 
 Old Indian Defense, Encyclopaedia of Chess Openings code
 Austin Cambridge A55, a British car
 GER Class A55, a British steam locomotive

See also 
 List of highways numbered 55